Agha Nasir (February 9, 1937 – July 12, 2016), was a Pakistani director, producer, broadcaster and a TV playwright. He started his career at Radio Pakistan in 1955. He later directed TV films and worked in the Pakistani television industry for over 50 years. Agha Nasir was considered by many people in Pakistan, as a 'living encyclopedia' of the broadcasting history in Pakistan.

Career
Agha Nasir graduated from the University of Karachi. He was a well-known radio writer, broadcaster and producer before Pakistan Television was launched from Lahore in 1964. 

He was one of the people who developed the logo of the Pakistan Television Corporation (PTV). He was a member of the pioneering team of people that first introduced television in Pakistan. This team was headed by Ubaidur Rahman (first General Manager) and 'the dynamic' Aslam Azhar (first Managing Director) of PTV Lahore Center. Agha Nasir produced the popular TV serials Girah and Pani Peh Naam and directed the PTV drama Taleem-e-Balighan. He guided Pakistan Television through its early days and then helped build it into a national institution. He was promoted many times during his career at Pakistan Television from a playwright to a programmes producer and director, a General Manager and then a Managing Director at Pakistan Television Corporation at its Lahore Center. He also served as a director general of Pakistan National Council of the Arts (PNCA).

Books
Gumshuda Log (People we have lost)
Gulshan-i-Yaad (The Garden of Memory)
Hum Jeetay Ji Masroof Rahey (We stayed busy as long as we lived)
This is PTV - Another Day, Another World
Agha sey Agha Nasir tak (Autobiography)

Awards and recognition
 President's Pride of Performance Award in 1993.
 Sitara-i-Imtiaz Award (Star of Excellence) by the President of Pakistan in 2012.

Death and legacy
Prime Minister Muhammad Nawaz Sharif expressed grief over his death on 12 July 2016 in Islamabad. Agha Nasir leaves behind his wife Safia Agha, son Agha Bilal and two daughters- Huma and Shumaila.

A major Pakistani English-language newspaper commented after his death, "He played a pivotal, pioneering role in establishment and development of PTV as a national institution; in fact, the two were inseparable."

References

1937 births
2016 deaths
Pakistani dramatists and playwrights
Urdu-language television shows
Recipients of the Pride of Performance
Recipients of Sitara-i-Imtiaz
Pakistani radio personalities
Pakistan Television Corporation executives
Muhajir people
University of Karachi alumni